Ujan Dudhpur is a gram panchayet in Kumarghat, Unakoti district, Tripura, India. The Manu River runs through this village.

There is a school in this panchayet named Dudhpur High School that educates almost 300 students.

References

Villages in Unakoti district